Sujūd, or sajdah, is the act of low bowing or prostration to Allah facing the qiblah (direction of the Kaaba at Mecca). It is usually done in standardized prayers (salah). The position involves kneeling and bowing till one touches the ground with the forehead, nose, palms, knees and toes, and remaining in that position until one attains a relaxed state while glorifying God ( subḥāna rabbiya l-ʾaʿlā, "Glory be to my Lord, the Most High!") thrice or more in odd number of times.

Overview 
Sujud (prostration) is one of the main pillars of daily prayer in Islam. A single act of sujud is called a sajdah (plural sajdāt). Muslims do sujud several times in each prayer, depending on the number of raka'at of prayer: two sajadat are performed every raka'ah, and prayers vary in obligatory length between two and four raka'at (additional supererogatory raka'at are often performed as sunnah muakkadah, or emulation of the example of Muhammad as represented in the sahih hadith). A raka'ah is a unit of set actions that have to be performed in a prayer. The shortest fard (obligatory) Muslim prayer is that of fajr, performed immediately before sunrise. It consists of two raka'ah. The raka'ah can be described as follows:

 Standing and saying Allahu akbar, reciting surah al-Fatiha, and reciting a short passage of the Quran such as sura al-Ikhlas.
 Performing ruku' (bowing down) without bending the knees and with hands resting on the knees, while reciting additional phrases to glorify Allah.
 Standing up from bowing, and reciting further.
 Going in prostration (sajdah) once, while reciting additional specific phrases to glorify Allah.
 Lifting the face up from prostration but kneeling or sitting on the ground.
 Performing a second prostration (sajdah).
 Rising for the second, third, or fourth raka'ah. In the last raka'ah, one remains sitting and recites the tashahhud, and then performs the taslim by turning the head to the right and saying, as-salamu alaikum wa rahmatu Allah wa barakatuh ("may the peace, mercy, and blessings of God be upon you"), and then turning the head to the left and repeating the blessing to conclude the prayer.
Points 1-7 define one raka'ah. Thus, the shortest prayer, that of fajr, contains four sajadat. For Hanafis, witr prayer is three raka'ahs, which is for them considered wajib, a level of necessity below that of fard but above all else: in practice, this makes witr obligatory.

While in sujud, the use of a turbah (a small piece of soil or clay, often a clay tablet), on which a person places their forehead, is compulsory in most Shi'a schools of Islam.

Other types of sujud

Sajdah of thankfulness

This is from the sunnah of the Islamic prophet Muhammad that whenever he used to hear news which would make him happy, he would make sujud to thank God.

Sajdah of recitation / Tilawah

During recitation (tilawa) of the Qur'an, including individual and congregation prayers, there are fifteen places where Muslims believe, when Muhammad recited a certain verse (ayah), he prostrated to God.
This act (sujud) is the sign and symbol of the great respect that Muslims attach to God/Allah because He is giver and  that He is Merciful too he who ask for His mercy and Grace.
The verses are:
۩ Q7:206, al Aʿrāf۩ Q13:15, ar-Raʻd 
۩ Q16:49, an-Nahl
۩ Q17:107, al-Isra
۩ Q19:58, Maryam
۩ Q22:18, al-Hajj 
۩ Q22:77, al-Hajj
۩ Q25:60, al-Furqan
۩ Q27:25, an-Naml
۩ Q32:15, as-Sajda
۩ Q38:24, Ṣād
۩ Q41:37, Fussilat
۩ Q53:62, an-Najm
۩ Q84:21, al-Inshiqaq
۩ Q96:19 al-Alaq

In most copies of the Qur'an these are indicated by the symbol ۩ , with an over-line on the word/s that invoked the prostration. Muslims must prostrate once in order to follow the Sunnah (example) of Muhammad and recite any one or more of the following along with Takbeer before and after the sujud,

Sajdah of forgetfulness

Sujud Sahwi or Sajdah of forgetfulness occurs during the ritual salat prayer. Out of forgetfulness a person can either omit obligatory parts of salat (Qabli) or add to the salat (Ba'adi). In either cases the person corrects their salat by doing the Sujud Sahwi.

Rule of direction of the sujud 
Sujud is made only to God. In prayer, Muslims face the Kaaba in Mecca, Saudi Arabia, but make their sujud to God, not the Kaaba. The Kaaba is only a united direction that Muslims face as it is the order of God in the Qur'an. If any person claiming to be Muslim makes a sujud to any thing/deity/person other than God, he is considered a disbeliever, unless it is forced upon them.

Sayings during sujud 
There are numerous things that a Muslim can say during sujud as is evident from the example of Muhammad. Among them are duas (prayers for God's help), hamd (praising of God), tasbih (glorifying God) and statements of Muhammad which make a person humble. Muslims are not allowed to recite the Qur'an during sujud. During the obligatory sujud during prayer one recites "".

Other uses 
Many Muslim footballers perform the sujud as a goal celebration, as well as cricketers when they score a century.

See also
Sujud Sahwi
Sujud Tilawa
Zemnoy poklon, earth-low bowing in the Eastern Orthodox Church originating from Jewish low bowing
 Proskynesis
 Dogeza, prostration in Japanese culture
 Kowtow, prostration in Chinese culture

References

External links 

 USC-MSA Compendium of Muslim Texts
 Detailed study of the word "SuJuD" in The Quran

 
Salah
Typography
Gestures of respect
Bowing
Kneeling
Salah terminology